Bissau-Guineans in France consist of migrants from Guinea-Bissau and their descendants living and working in France.

History                                   
The first Bissau-Guineans immigrants came in the early 20th century. There were Manjacks navigators who worked for French companies. They came via Senegal to ports like Marseille, and go to Paris. There was family reunification with wives of the navigators who came in France in the 1950s and 1960s. There was also another wave of Bissau-Guinean immigration, mostly composed of economic migrants.

Origins                               
Most of the Bissau-Guineans in France are Manjack people, from the north-west of Bissau-Guinea.

References                               

African diaspora in France
Society of France
 
Bissau-Guinean diaspora
Immigration to France by country of origin